Lyndon Dean Stromberg (b. November 27, 1962) is an American entrepreneur, sculptor and artist. Works include "Our Universe" at the Smithsonian Institution, National Museum of the American Indian, "Rome" at Caesars Palace, "The World" at Winstar Casino and the "Virgin of Guadalupe" at the Dallas Cathedral Cathedral Santuario de Guadalupe.

Companies
Stromberg is founder of several companies which are affiliated in the Stromberg Group. They include of 300 artisans. 
These include:
Stromberg Architectural Products Inc, manufacturer of architectural shapes and castings.
StonePly a natural stone/composite company
Maverick Design a designer and installer of architectural castings
Lumonyx a manufacturer of translucent glass and resin.
Stained Glass Inc. a team of dedicated artisans creating stained glass art.
TerraGlas a producer of architectural terra cotta sculpture and historic restoration materials.

Sculpture and art
Stromberg is also a sculptor and artist known for his monumental works and architectural sculpture. Stromberg's works have appeared in the Smithsonian, The National Museum of the American Indian, The US Pentagon Building, the US Capitol Mall, Caesars Palace, The Mirage Casino, The Texas State Capitol, The Atlantis Resort and in various museums, casinos and public exhibitions. 
In 1999 Stromberg created the world's largest fiberglass sculpture, the “Great Hall of Waters” over the lobby of the Atlantis resort in the Bahamas. Sculptures include works in fiberglass, cast stone, marble and glass as well as various resins.

Selected architectural sculpture
Siegfried and Roy's Secret Garden, The Mirage, Las Vegas
Caesars Palace, Las Vegas
Great Hall of Waters, Atlantis Paradise Island Bahamas
Baldachin at St. Anthony Cathedral, Beaumont, Texas
Texas fountain at Texas State Capitol
Our Universe at the Smithsonian Institution, National Museum of the American Indian
Americas Heroes at The Pentagon

References
Dallas Morning News, December 6, 2007
Greenville Herald Banner Progress Issue page D 1 and 2 July 15, 1998
Texas Catholic Dec 14, 2007
Chickasaw Times November 8, 2008

External links
Channel 11 News Slide show of commemoration of the Sculpture of the Virgin of Guadalupe
Hotel Online "Lyndon Stromberg's Spectacular New 140' Sculpture Sits Atop Atlantis Hotel and Resort"
Virgin Mary statue donated to downtown Dallas cathedral, Sculptor Donates
Winstar expansion
Stromberg Group Company Website

1962 births
Living people
American architectural sculptors
Artists from Enid, Oklahoma
Sculptors from Oklahoma